The Holliday Street aqueduct is a Grade II listed aqueduct at the start of the Worcester and Birmingham Canal in central Birmingham, England.

Built in 1870 the cast iron structure carries the canal and a wide access road originally leading from Bridge Street to Worcester Wharf (now housing) over Holliday Street very close to the Worcester Bar stop lock in Gas Street Basin.

Immediately to the south of Holliday Street the Cross-City Line (originally the Birmingham West Suburban Railway) rail line runs in a tunnel parallel to Holliday Street. A short distance south of that is the disused rail tunnel of the original line which terminated at Central Goods railway station (the previous terminus of the Birmingham West Suburban Railway). Immediately south of the disused rail tunnel the canal turns sharply between The Mailbox and The Cube through ninety degrees to run parallel to the rail tunnels.

Water leak in 2015
In February 2015 water was found to be leaking into the disused rail tunnel and the canal was drained between two temporary dams. The leak was traced to a hole in the canal bed.

References

Worcester and Birmingham Canal
Navigable aqueducts in England
Grade II listed buildings in Birmingham
Grade II listed bridges